Potomac is an unincorporated community and census-designated place (CDP) in Missoula County, Montana, United States. It is in the southeastern part of the county, in the valley of Camas Creek and Union Creek, which flows northwest to the Blackfoot River, part of the Clark Fork watershed.

Montana Highway 200 passes the northern edge of the community, leading northeast  to Ovando and west  to Missoula. 

Potomac was first listed as a CDP prior to the 2020 census.

Demographics

References 

Census-designated places in Missoula County, Montana
Census-designated places in Montana